Lily Matthews (born 30 September 1989) is a Welsh racing cyclist from Builth Wells, Wales. Matthews is a former cross country runner who began competing in mountain biking aged 17 and went on to represent Great Britain in the under-23 cross-country race at the 2010 UCI Mountain Bike & Trials World Championships and Wales in the Women's road race at the 2010 Commonwealth Games in Delhi. She did not finish the race.

Matthews was due to begin studying a degree in medicine in 2008 at Cardiff University, but deferred her place to concentrate on her sporting career.

Palmarès

2011 Key Results 

15th UCI Mountain bike World Cup Under 23 Dalby Forest

2010 Key Results

1st Overall British Mountain bike Series 
3rd GP MTB XC Beringen, Belgium 
1st  Welsh National Road Race Championships
1st British National Under 23 Mountain bike Championships Pippingford Park
8th European Under 23 Mountain bike Championships Israel
21st World Under 23 Mountain bike Championship, Canada 

2009 key Results 

25th World Under 23 Mountain Bike Championships Canberra, Australia 
6th British Elite Mountain Bike Marathon Championships Margam Park, Wales
2nd British Under 23 National Mountain Bike Championships, Innerleithen 
5th British National Cyclocross Championships, Bradford

References

1989 births
Living people
Welsh female cyclists
Cyclists at the 2010 Commonwealth Games
Commonwealth Games competitors for Wales
People from Builth Wells
Sportspeople from Powys